The Women's +75 kg weightlifting event at the 2012 Summer Olympics in London, United Kingdom, took place at ExCeL London.

Summary
Total score was the sum of the lifter's best result in each of the snatch and the clean and jerk, with three lifts allowed for each lift.  In case of a tie, the lighter lifter won; if still tied, the lifter who took the fewest attempts to achieve the total score won.  Lifters without a valid snatch score did not perform the clean and jerk.

Russia's Tatiana Kashirina set a world record in the snatch with a lift of 151kg, becoming the first woman to snatch 150kg, while China's Zhou Lulu set a world record in the total with 333kg, as well as an Olympic record in the clean and jerk with a lift of 187kg. 

Ukraine's Svitlana Cherniavska was on the start list but did not compete.

Schedule
All times are British Summer Time (UTC+01:00)

Records
Prior to this competition, the existing world and Olympic records were as follows.

Results

New records

References 

Results 

Weightlifting at the 2012 Summer Olympics
Olymp
Women's events at the 2012 Summer Olympics